The Baby Channel was a television channel aimed towards pregnant women and parents of pre-school children. Broadcast in the United Kingdom, it launched on 10 October 2005 on the Sky Digital platform. It closed down at 6am on 24 November 2008. The channel was then rebranded Simply Movies and moved EPG numbers from 272 to 341.

External links
Official site

Television channels in the United Kingdom
Television channels and stations established in 2005
Television channels and stations disestablished in 2008